Georgi Krumov Bachev (born 18 April 1977) is a former Bulgarian professional footballer who played as a winger or forward.

Career
He played for a few clubs, including Slavia Sofia, Levski Sofia and Vihren Sandanski.

He played for the Bulgaria national football team and was a participant at the 1998 FIFA World Cup.

Bachev has managed Loko Mezdra.

References

External links

 Profile at Levskisofia.info 

1977 births
Living people
Bulgarian footballers
Sportspeople from Blagoevgrad
Bulgaria international footballers
PFC Slavia Sofia players
PFC Levski Sofia players
OFC Vihren Sandanski players
1998 FIFA World Cup players
First Professional Football League (Bulgaria) players
Second Professional Football League (Bulgaria) players
Macedonian Bulgarians

Association football forwards